Horst Wolter (born 8 June 1942 in Berlin, Germany) is a German former international footballer who played as a goalkeeper.

Club career 
A Bundesliga winner with Eintracht Braunschweig in 1967, Wolter played almost 250 West German top-flight matches for Braunschweig and Hertha BSC.

International career 
The goalkeeper won 13 caps for the West German national team between 1967 and 1970. Wolter played his final match for Die Mannschaft in the third-place play-off win at the 1970 FIFA World Cup, replacing regular first choice Sepp Maier, against Uruguay.

Honours

Club
Eintracht Braunschweig
 Bundesliga: 1966–67

References

External links
 
 
 

1942 births
Living people
Footballers from Berlin
German footballers
Germany international footballers
Hertha BSC players
Eintracht Braunschweig players
1970 FIFA World Cup players
Bundesliga players
Association football goalkeepers